Cyprus participated in the Eurovision Song Contest 2009 with the song "Firefly" written by Nikolas Metaxas. The song was performed by Christina Metaxa. The Cypriot broadcaster Cyprus Broadcasting Corporation (CyBC) organised a national final in order to select the Cypriot entry for the 2009 contest in Moscow, Russia. The national final featured 10 entries, resulting in the selection of Christina Metaxa with "Firefly" at the final on 7 February 2010.

Cyprus was drawn to compete in the first semi-final of the Eurovision Song Contest which took place on 14 May 2009. Performing during the show in position 7, "Firefly" was not among the 10 qualifying entries of the second semi-final and therefore did not qualify to compete in the final. It was later revealed that Cyprus placed fourteenth out of the 19 participating countries in the semi-final with 32 points.

Background

Prior to the 2009 contest, Cyprus had participated in the Eurovision Song Contest twenty-six times since their debut in the 1981 contest. Its best placing was fifth, which it achieved three times: in the 1982 competition with the song "Mono i agapi" performed by Anna Vissi, in the 1997 edition with "Mana mou" performed by Hara and Andreas Constantinou, and the 2004 contest with "Stronger Every Minute" performed by Lisa Andreas. Cyprus' least successful result was in the 1986 contest when it placed last with the song "Tora zo" by Elpida, receiving only four points in total. However, its worst finish in terms of points received was when it placed second to last in the 1999 contest with "Tha'nai erotas" by Marlain Angelidou, receiving only two points.

The Cypriot national broadcaster, Cyprus Broadcasting Corporation (CyBC), broadcasts the event within Cyprus and organises the selection process for the nation's entry. CyBC confirmed their intentions to participate at the 2009 Eurovision Song Contest on 5 October 2009. Cyprus has used various methods to select the Cypriot entry in the past, such as internal selections and televised national finals to choose the performer, song or both to compete at Eurovision. The broadcaster selected the 2007 Cypriot entry via an internal selection. In 2008, CyBC opted to organised a national final to select the Cypriot entry, a method which was continued for 2009.

Before Eurovision

National final 
The Cypriot national final developed by CyBC in order to select Cyprus' entry for the Eurovision Song Contest 2009 took place on 31 January 2009 at the CyBC Studio 3 in Nicosia. The show was hosted by Charis Kkolos and Maria Michail and broadcast on RIK 1, RIK Sat, Trito Programma, London Greek Radio as well as online via the broadcaster's website cybc.cy.

Competing entries 
Artists and composers were able to submit their entries to the broadcaster between 10 October 2008 and 28 November 2008. All artists and songwriters were required to have Cypriot nationality, origin or residency as of 2007. At the conclusion of the deadline, 74 entries were received by CyBC. A seven-member selection committee which included two CyBC representatives shortlisted 20 entries from the received submissions, and the 10 selected entries were announced on 16 December 2008. Among the competing artists were 1995 and 2000 Cypriot Eurovision entrant Alex Panayi and 1999 Cypriot Eurovision entrant Marlain Angelidou.

Final 
The final took place on 7 February 2009. Ten entries competed and the winner, "Firefly" performed by Christina Metaxa, was selected exclusively by a public televote. In addition to the performances of the competing entries, the show featured a guest performance by 2007 Greek Eurovision entrant Sarbel.

Promotion 
Christina Metaxa made several appearances across Europe to specifically promote "Firefly" as the Cypriot Eurovision entry. On 12 March, Metaxa performed "Firefly" during the Greek Eurovision national final Ellinikós Telikós 2009. On 18 April, Metaxa performed during the Eurovision in Concert event which was held at the Amsterdam Marcanti venue in Amsterdam, Netherlands and hosted by Marga Bult and Maggie MacNeal. On 17 April, Metaxa performed during the UK Eurovision Preview Party, which was held in London, United Kingdom and hosted by Nicki French and Paddy O'Connell. Christina Metaxa also took part in promotional activities in Ukraine between 21 and 24 April which included several television and radio appearances.

At Eurovision 

According to Eurovision rules, all nations with the exceptions of the host country and the "Big Four" (France, Germany, Spain and the United Kingdom) are required to qualify from one of two semi-finals in order to compete for the final; the top nine songs from each semi-final as determined by televoting progress to the final, and a tenth was determined by back-up juries. The European Broadcasting Union (EBU) split up the competing countries into six different pots based on voting patterns from previous contests, with countries with favourable voting histories put into the same pot. On 30 January 2009, a special allocation draw was held which placed each country into one of the two semi-finals. Cyprus was placed into the second semi-final, to be held on 14 May 2009. The running order for the semi-finals was decided through another draw on 16 March 2009 and Cyprus was set to perform in position 7, following the entry from Norway and before the entry from Slovakia.

The two semi-finals and the final were broadcast in Cyprus on RIK 1, RIK SAT and Trito Programma with commentary by Melina Karageorgiou as well as on Deftero Programma with English commentary by Nathan Morley. The Cypriot spokesperson, who announced the Cypriot votes during the final, was Sophia Paraskeva.

Semi-final 
Christina Metaxa took part in technical rehearsals on 5 and 8 May, followed by dress rehearsals on 13 and 14 May. The Cypriot performance featured Christina Metaxa wearing a white dress and joined by five backing vocalists, two of them in the front of the stage and dressed in white with the remaining three at the back of the stage and dressed in black. The performance featured Metaxa and the two backing vocalists on shining white rotating boxes that were stapled at the end of the song. The stage and LED screens predominantly displayed sea blue colours and a dark forest background with falling leaves and fireflies. The artistic director of the performance was Fotis Nikolaou. The backing vocalists that joined Christina Metaxa were Anna-Karin Eliades, Chris Charalambides, the composer of "Firefly" Nikolas Metaxas, Riana Athanasiou and Richard Hall.

At the end of the show, Cyprus was not announced among the top 10 entries in the second semi-final and therefore failed to qualify to compete in the final. It was later revealed that Cyprus placed fourteenth in the semi-final, receiving a total of 32 points.

Voting 
Below is a breakdown of points awarded to Cyprus and awarded by Cyprus in the second semi-final and grand final of the contest. The nation awarded its 12 points to Greece in the semi-final and to the final of the contest.

Points awarded to Cyprus

Points awarded by Cyprus

Detailed voting results

References

2009
Countries in the Eurovision Song Contest 2009
Eurovision